Tomáš Holeš (born 31 March 1993) is a Czech football defender. He currently plays for Slavia Prague in the Fortuna Liga and the Czech national team.

Club career
On 6 January 2022, Holeš announced a new contract with Slavia Prague that will last until 2026.

International career
Holeš has played international football at under-21 level for Czech Republic U21.

He made his full international debut in a UEFA Nations League game against Scotland on 7 September 2020, playing the full 90 minutes as the Czech Republic lost 1–2.

On 25 May 2021, Holeš was included in the final 26-man squad for the postponed UEFA Euro 2020 tournament. On 27 June 2021, he scored the Czech Republic's first goal in the 68th minute and provided an assist for the second goal 12 minutes later in a 2–0 win over Netherlands to qualify for the UEFA Euro 2020 quarterfinals.

Career statistics

Club

International

International goals
Scores and results list Czech Republic's goal tally first.

Honours 
Slavia Prague
 Czech First League: 2019–20, 2020–21
Individual
Czech First League Player of the Year: 2021–22
Czech First League Midfield of the Year: 2021–22

References

External links 

1993 births
Living people
Czech footballers
Czech Republic international footballers
Czech Republic under-21 international footballers
Czech First League players
FC Hradec Králové players
FK Jablonec players
SK Slavia Prague players
Association football defenders
People from Nové Město na Moravě
Czech National Football League players
UEFA Euro 2020 players
Sportspeople from the Vysočina Region